Angela Reynolds is a British stage and television actress. Her most prolific role so far has been playing Fizz for The Tweenies, both on television and on stage.

Her natural accent is London, and she is a mezzo-soprano.

Angela Reynolds co-runs an interactive stilt walking entertainment company called Bright'n'Funny and runs her own company Funnyballoons.

External links
 E15: Angela Reynolds
 Bright 'n' Funny Website
 

Actresses from London
English television actresses
Living people
Year of birth missing (living people)
British mezzo-sopranos
English stage actresses